Jean-Raymond Toso (born 17 December 1952) is a former French racing cyclist. He rode in the 1980 Tour de France.

References

External links

1952 births
Living people
French male cyclists
Cyclists from Paris